Hamilton Creek may refer to:

Streams

Australia
Hamilton Creek (Dee River tributary), a tributary of the Dee River in Queensland

United States

Hamilton Creek (Cahuilla Creek tributary), in Riverside County, California
Hamilton Creek (Santa Ana River tributary), a tributary of the Santa Ana River, California
Hamilton Creek (Meramec River tributary), in Crawford and Washington Counties, Missouri
Hamilton Creek (St. Louis County), in Missouri
Hamilton Creek (Oregon), in Berlin, Oregon
Hamilton Creek (Columbia River tributary), in Skamania County, Washington

Settlements
Hamilton Creek, Queensland, Australia

See also
Hamilton Branch (disambiguation)